India Optel Limited is an Indian state-owned defence company, headquartered in Dehradun, India established in 2021 as part of the restructuring and corporatization of the Ordnance Factory Board into seven different Public Sector Undertakings. India Optel primarily manufactures Electro-optical sensors, weapon sights and communication equipment for the use of the Indian Armed Forces and foreign militaries.

India Optel Limited consists of the following three factories of the erstwhile Ordnance Factory Board:

See also
Other PSUs formed from Ordnance Factory Board:-
Advanced Weapons and Equipment India Limited (AWE), Kanpur
Armoured Vehicles Nigam Limited (AVANI), Chennai
Gliders India Limited (GIL), Kanpur
Munitions India Limited (MIL), Pune
Troop Comforts Limited (TCL), Kanpur
Yantra India Limited (YIL), Nagpur

References

Defence companies of India
Government-owned companies of India
Indian companies established in 2021